Ronald Ozzy Lamola (born 21 November 1983) is a South African lawyer and politician, Minister of Justice and Correctional Services, and a member of the African National Congress (ANC). He has also been serving as a Member of the National Assembly of South Africa since 22 May 2019. He is a member of the ANC's National Executive Committee and National Working Committee. Lamola had previously been involved in the African National Congress Youth League.

Early life and education
Ronald Ozzy Lamola was born 21 November 1983 in the town of Bushbuckridge, then part of South Africa's Transvaal Province. He joined the ANC Youth League at the age of thirteen in 1996. In 2000, he matriculated from Mchacka High School. He soon enrolled for a law degree at the University of Venda. During his time at the university, he was President of the Student Representative Council (SRC) and Chairperson of the South African Students Congress in Limpopo.

He achieved a practical legal training degree from the University of South Africa in 2006. In 2008, he obtained a post-graduate certificate in corporate law from the University of South Africa. Later on, he received a post-graduate certificate in banking law and the financial markets. Lamola acquired an LLM in corporate law from the University of Pretoria. He attained a post-graduate certificate in telecommunications policy and regulation and management from Wits Enterprise. He holds two master's degrees from the University of Pretoria.

Career
Lamola started his law career as a lawyer at TMN Kgomo and Associates in 2006. Later on, in 2009, he was employed as a manager of the Govan Mbeki Local Municipality. He was the Director in the Office of the Mpumalanga MEC for Culture, Sports and Recreation from 2009 until 2011. Shortly after in 2011, he briefly served as the acting spokesperson for the Mpumalanga Premier David Mabuza.

He is a former Deputy President of the African National Congress Youth League (ANCYL). He served alongside Youth League President Julius Malema prior to Malema's expulsion from the position in 2012 for bringing the party into disrepute.

Lamola is a fierce critic of former ANC President Jacob Zuma. He openly endorsed Kgalema Motlanthe to succeed Zuma in 2012.

For the 2014 elections, Lamola was a candidate for the National Assembly since he was 175th on the ANC's national list. Due to the ANC's electoral performance, he was not elected to Parliament. After the 2015 ANCYL elective conference, Lamola disappeared from the public eye and subsequently managed his own law firm.

In 2017, he endorsed Cyril Ramaphosa to become ANC President. In December of the same year, Lamola was elected to the National Executive Committee of the African National Congress (NEC). Shortly after, in January 2018, the ANC NEC appointed him to the party's National Working Committee, the party's highest decision-making structure. Following the May 2019 elections, Lamola took office as a Member of the National Assembly. President Cyril Ramaphosa appointed him to the post of Minister of Justice and Correctional Services on 29 May. He assumed office on 30 May.

Personal life
Lamola married Bawinile “Winnie” Msiza at the Cunning Moor in Bushbuckridge, Mpumalanga, on 8 March 2013.

References

Living people
1983 births
People from Bushbuckridge Local Municipality
African National Congress politicians
Members of the National Assembly of South Africa
Government ministers of South Africa
Justice ministers of South Africa